The Torrenthorn is a mountain of the Bernese Alps, overlooking Leukerbad in the canton of Valais. It lies south of the Majinghorn.

In winter the Torrenthorn is part of a ski area.

References

External links
 Torrenthorn on Hikr
 Climb account from the cablecar station at the Rinderhütte

Bernese Alps
Mountains of the Alps
Mountains of Switzerland
Mountains of Valais
Two-thousanders of Switzerland